Newfoundland English is a term referring to any of several accents and dialects of Atlantic Canadian English found in the province of Newfoundland and Labrador. Most of these differ substantially from the English commonly spoken elsewhere in Canada and North America. Many Newfoundland dialects are influenced by the dialects of England's West Country, in particular the city of Bristol and the counties of Cornwall, Devon, Dorset, Wiltshire, Hampshire and Somerset, while in terms of general cultural heritage, one estimate claims 80 to 85 percent of Newfoundland's English heritage came from England's southwest. Other Newfoundland dialects are influenced by the dialects of Ireland's southeastern counties, particularly Waterford, Wexford, Kilkenny and Cork. Still others blend elements of both and there is also a discernible influence of Scottish English. This reflects the fact that while the Scottish came in smaller numbers than the English and Irish, they had a large influence on Newfoundland society. 

The dialects that comprise Newfoundland English developed because of Newfoundland's history as well as its geography. As to history, Newfoundland was one of the first areas settled by England in North America, beginning in small numbers in the early 17th century before peaking in the early 19th century. Newfoundland was a British colony until 1907 when it became a Dominion within the British Empire. It became a part of Canada in 1949 as the last province to join confederation. As to geography, Newfoundland is an island in the North Atlantic Ocean, separated by the Strait of Belle Isle from Labrador, the sparsely populated mainland part of the province. Most of the population remained rather isolated on the island, allowing the dialects time to develop independently of those on the North American continent. Today, some words from Newfoundland English have been adopted through popular culture in other places in Canada (especially in Ontario and eastward).

Historically, Newfoundland English was first recognized as a separate dialect in the late 18th century when George Cartwright published a glossary of Newfoundland words.

Other names for Newfoundland English 
Newfoundland English is often called Newfinese. The term Newfie is also sometimes used, though this word is often seen as pejorative.

Phonological and grammatical features

Consonants 
Th-stopping

For example, “that thing over there” becomes “dat ting over dere”. This is derived from Hiberno-English.

Slit fricative t

The phoneme  when appearing at the end of word or between vowel sounds, is pronounced as in Hiberno-English; the most common pronunciation is as a voiceless alveolar non-sibilant fricative, also known as a "slit fricative". Thus, "hitting"  is distinguished from "hissing"  only by the fact that the fricative in the latter word is pronounced with clenched teeth (see sibilant consonant) and is laminal, rather than being apical like the slit fricative in "hitting". As the th-sounds are stopped in the dialect, there is no confusion between the slit  and the  sound.

H-dropping

Both h-dropping and h-insertion occur in the English West Country as well as in many varieties of Newfoundland English – for example, Holyrood becomes “‘Olyrood” and Avondale becomes “H’Avondale”

Rhoticity

Newfoundland is mainly a rhotic accent like most of North America, as well as Ireland and the English West Country. However, some non-rhoticity can be found in some regions.

L-darkness

Some speakers of Newfoundland English pronounce  as unvelarized and so the phrase sell it later is pronounced  (cf. General American ), which may be due to Irish-settled varieties of English exhibiting light variants in both coda and onset positions.

Vowels 
In much of Newfoundland, the words fear and fair are homophones. A similar phenomenon is found in the Norfolk dialect of East Anglia and in New Zealand English.

Newfoundland English traditionally lacked Canadian raising; however in the generations since Newfoundland's 1949 merger with Canada this has changed to some extent.

Grammar

"After" past 
In a move almost certainly taken from Hiberno-English and influenced by the Irish language, speakers avoid using the verb to have in past participles, preferring formulations including after, such as I'm after telling him to stop instead of I have told him to stop. This is because in the Irish language there is no verb "to have", and more particularly because Irish Gaelic uses a construction using the words "Tar éis" (meaning "after") to convey the sense of "having just" done something – "Táim tar éis é a dhéanamh" meaning "I am just after doing it" or " I have just done it". Possession is indicated by "Ta ... agam" literally ".... is at me".

Northern Subject Rule 
Newfoundland English often follows the Northern Subject Rule, a legacy of settlement from South East Ireland, which in turn was influenced by Anglo-Irish settlement from Northern England into Ireland. For example, the verb "to fly" is conjugated for third-person plural as the birds flies.

Archaic pronouns 

Ye is the plural form of you (singular) instead of you (plural), similar to how you guys is often used to replace you (plural) in Standard Canadian English. For example, when addressing two or more people, or when addressing one person but referring to everyone that person is with, a speaker of Newfoundland English would ask "What do ye think?" instead of "What do you guys think?" However, "What do you think?" would still be used to refer to a single person alone and only then, which avoids the confusion present in other English dialects in which a group of people would not know whether the speaker is inquiring about the opinion of the person they are directly speaking to or the various opinions of the entire group. In most areas of the province that use the pronoun such as the Avalon Peninsula outside St. John's, ye mirrors the same variant in Hiberno-English in which you (singular), you (plural), and they correspond to you, ye, and dey (the latter simply arising from a change in pronunciation and so the term is spoken dey but written they, but the rest are written and spoken in the same way). Variants of ye are also used for alternative cases, such as yeer (your), yeers (yours), and yeerselves (yourselves). In some communities on the island's northeast coast, you (singular), you (plural), and they correspond to ye, dee, and dey, respectively.

Habitual aspect using "be" 
The word bes  is sometimes used in place of the normally-conjugated forms of to be to describe continual actions or states of being, as in that rock usually bes under water instead of that rock is usually under water, but the normal conjugation of to be is used in all other cases.

"Does be" is an Irish grammar calque into English. Since there is no habitual aspect in English, so Irish speakers learning English would say "does be" as a literal translation of "bíonn mé" "I (habitually) am".

"Me" for "my" and "mine" 
Use or ownership in Newfoundland English is characterized by pronouncing "my" as "me", which is common also in Irish, Scottish, Northern English, Western English, and some overseas dialects like that of Australia. As with all other sound shifts, not all possible words have been changed in the other dialects noted. An example in Newfoundland would be "Where's me hat?" for "Where's my hat?".

The older usage of  has carried over into present-day Newfoundland English like for the other dialects noted. An example would be "Where's me hat?" for "Where's my hat?".

Use of "to" for location 
The use of "to" to denote location is common in Newfoundland English by using "where's that to?" rather than the more standard "where's that?" That usage comes from West Country dialects and is still common in southwest England, particularly in Bristol.

Other notes 
 Archaic adverbial intensifiers are preserved in Newfoundland (e.g., in Newfoundland that play was right boring and that play was some boring both mean "that play was very boring"). That is also retained in Northern English dialects such as Yorkshire and Geordie and is sometimes heard elsewhere in Atlantic Canada.
 Newfoundland English is not homogenous and can vary markedly from community to community as well as from region to region. That reflects both ethnic origin as well as relative isolation. For many decades, Newfoundland had very few roads connecting its many communities. Fishing villages, in particular, remained very isolated.
 In Newfoundland English, the affirmative yeah is often made with an inhalation rather than an exhalation among the older generations. This is an example of a rare pulmonic ingressive phone.
 In Newfoundland English, it is typical for a response to a metaphorical question like How's she cuttin'? with a dry literal response. A proper response to the foresaid question would be Like a knife (the question/greeting of "How's she Cuttin'?" is a phrase still current in the Irish Midlands and North but is rarely, if ever, responded to with such a literal answer).
 To non-Newfoundlanders, speakers of Newfoundland English may seem to speak faster than speakers of General Canadian. The perceived tempo difference may be a coupling of subtle pronunciation differences and unusual sayings and can be a contributing factor to the difficulty non-Newfoundlanders sometimes experience with the dialect.

Other languages and dialects that have influenced Newfoundland English 
There is also a dialect of French centred mainly on the Port au Port Peninsula on the west coast of the island, and it has affected the syntax of the English in the area. One example of these constructs found in Newfoundland is Throw grandpa down the stairs his hat, a dative construction in which the hat, not the grandfather, makes the trip. Another is the use of French subject pronoun reinforcement constructions in sentences such as the reply to a question like Where are you going?: Me I'm goin' downtown (this form of subject pronoun grammar also exists in Irish English and Jerriais).

Newfoundland French was deliberately discouraged by the Newfoundland government through the public schools during the mid-20th-century, and only a small handful of mainly elderly people are still fluent in the French-Newfoundland dialect. In the last couple of decades, many parents in the region have demanded and obtained Canadian French education for their children, but that would be Standard French education and does not represent a continuation of the old dialect per se. Some people living in the Codroy Valley on the south-west tip of the island are also ancestrally francophone but represent Acadian settlers from the Maritime Provinces of Canada who arrived during the 19th century. That population has also lost the French language.

The greatest distinction between Newfoundland English and General Canadian English is its vocabulary. It includes some Inuit and First Nations words (for example tabanask, a kind of sled), which are preserved archaic English words no longer found in other English dialects (such as pook, a mound of hay; dipper, a saucepan; and damper, a stove burner), Irish survivals like sleveen and angishore, compound words created from English words to describe things unique to Newfoundland (such as stun breeze, a wind of at least , English words which have undergone a semantic shift (for example rind, the bark of a tree), and unique words whose origins are unknown (for example diddies, a nightmare).

Expressions 
In recent years, the most commonly-noted Newfoundland English expression might be Whadd'ya at?  (What are you at?), loosely translated to "How's it going?" or "What are you doing?" Coming in a close second might be "You're stunned as me arse, b'y," implying incredible stupidity or foolishness in the person being spoken to.

Other local expressions include:
 Eh, b'y (also spelled 'Aye b'y' and 'ay b'y', and sometimes said as 'yes b'y): shortened form of "yes, boy." It's a term used to agree with what someone is saying. Can be used sarcastically. 
 Yes, b'y: Yes boy. It is an expression of awe or disbelief. Also commonly used sarcastically to mean yeah right. It is similar to "eh, b'y."
 Where ya at?: Where are you?
 Stay where you're to/at till I comes where ya're at/to.: Wait there for me
 Get on the go: Let's go. It is also a common euphemism for partying. on the go by itself can also refer to a relationship – similar to a dating stage, but more hazy. The term also refers to drinking ("gettin on the go tonight" – going out drinking tonight)
 Havin' a time: having fun 
 You knows yourself: Responding to statement in agreement.
 What are ye at?, or Wadda ya'at b'y?: How are you doing, or sometimes What are you doing?
 Wah?: what?
  What's after happenin' now? : What happened? (used when someone seems distraught or emotional)  
 Havin' a yarn: Used to refer to a group telling a long story or having a long conversation.
 Luh!: Look! (Also used the same way as "Lo", to draw attention to something or somewhere)
 G'wan b'y!: Literally, "go on, b'y/boy?" Can be used as a term of disbelief or as sarcasm, like the term "No, really?"
 Hows you gettin' on, cocky?: "How are you today?"
 You're a nice kind young feller: "You are a nice young boy"
 Me Son: a term of endearment, like "my friend" or "my bud."
 Me ol' cock: another term of endearment like "my friend," "me son," or "my bud."
 You're some crooked: You are grouchy
 He[she/dey] just took off:, They left recently/quickly. Whether or not it denotes time depends on use of the word "just;" by not including "just" denotes speed, whereas using "just" denotes time.
 Mudder or me mudder: mother
 Fadder or me fadder: father
 Contrary: Difficult to get along with.
 After: "have." For example, "I'm after sitting down" for "I have sat down." it is also used like "trying" (i.e.: whaddya after doin' now?, "what have you done?")
 Oh me nerves: an expression of annoyance
 Ducky: female friend or relative, used affectionately. This is commonly used in the English Midlands but is used for both genders.
 My love: female friend or relative
 Batter: Leave/begone. Typically used in the form of the phrase "Batter to Jesus." It can also be used as "Take that (object) away from here", in the form of "Batter that"
 My treasure: female friend or relative. These three terms are used platonically.
 Rimmed/Warped: to be deformed or distorted in an unusable fashion. Often used to describe someone who is seen upon as weird or an outcast (i.e., She's rimmed, b'y).
 Right: synonym for "very;" i.e.: "She's right pretty."
 Scrob/Scrawb: a scratch on one's skin, likely from the Irish "scríob" (i.e.: "The cat gave me some scrob, b'y" falling into disuse in lieu of "scratch")
 Gets on/Getting on, used to refer to how a person or group behaves (i.e. "You knows how da b'ys gets on" / "How's she getting on?")
 On the go, To have something processing ("I've got an application on the go") or be in a relationship ("He's got some missus on the go")
 Can't do 'ar ting when ya got nar ting ta do 'ar ting wit. - "You can't do anything when you have nothing to do anything with." ['ar - any, opposite of nar (from nary, as in "nary a one" - not a one)]
(Some examples taken from A Biography of the English Language by C.M. Millward)

Also of note is the widespread use of the term b'y as a common form of address. It is shorthand for "boy", (and is a turn of phrase particularly pronounced with the Waterford dialect of Hiberno-Irish) but is used variably to address members of either sex. Another term of endearment, often spoken by older generations, is me ducky, used when addressing a female in an informal manner, and usually placed at the end of a sentence which is often a question (Example: How's she goin', me ducky?) – a phrase also found in East Midlands British English. Also pervasive as a sentence ending is right used in the same manner as the Canadian eh or the American huh or y'know. Even if the sentence would otherwise be a non-question, the pronunciation of right can sometimes make it seem like affirmation is being requested.

Certain words have also gained prominence amongst the speakers of Newfoundland English. For instance, a large body of water that may be referred to as a "lake" elsewhere may often but not uniformly be referred to as a "pond." In addition, a large landmass that rises high out of the ground, regardless of elevation, is referred to unwaveringly as a "hill," but there is a difference between a hill and a big hill.

Another major characteristic of some variants of Newfoundland English is adding the letter 'h' to words that begin with vowel sounds or removing 'h' from words that begin with it. In some districts, the term house commonly is referred to as the "ouse," for example, and "even" might be said "h'even." The idiom "'E drops 'is h in 'Olyrood and picks en up in H'Avondal." is often used to describe that by using the neighbouring eastern towns Holyrood and Avondale as examples. There are many different variations of the Newfoundland dialect depending on geographical location within the province. It is also important to note that Labrador has a very distinct culture and dialect within its region.

Other 
Although it is referred to as "Newfoundland English" or "Newfinese", the island of Newfoundland is not the only place which uses the dialect. Some southerly areas of Labrador and an area near the Labrador border, the mostly English-speaking Basse-Côte-Nord of Quebec, also use it. Younger generations of the area have adapted the way of speaking, and created some of their own expressions. Some older generations speak Newfoundland English, but it is more commonly used by the younger generations. B'y is one of the most common terms used in the area.

It is also common to hear Newfoundland English in Yellowknife; Southern Alberta; and Fort McMurray, Alberta, where many Newfoundlanders have moved or commute regularly for employment. Newfoundland English is also used frequently in the city of Cambridge, Ontario because of the high population of Newfoundlanders there, most of whom are from Bell Island.

See also 
 Newfoundland Irish
 List of communities in Newfoundland and Labrador
 List of people of Newfoundland and Labrador
 Highland English
 Manx English

References 

Works cited

 "CBC Archives." CBCnews. CBC/Radio Canada, n.d. Web. 21 May 2019.
 "Comedian Says Memorial University Taking His Catch Phrase | CBC News." CBCnews. CBC/Radio Canada, 19 July 2012. Web. 21 May 2019.
 "Dictionary of Newfoundland English." Dictionary of Newfoundland English Search. N.p., n.d. Web. 21 May 2019.
 "Do Be Doing Be's: Habitual Aspect in Irish English." Sentence First. N.p., 12 May 2015. Web. 21 May 2019.
 "Great Vowel Shift." The History of English – Early Modern English (c. 1500 – c. 1800). N.p., n.d. Web. 21 May 2019.
 Higgins, Jenny. "Scottish in NL." Scottish in NL. N.p., n.d. Web. 21 May 2019.
 "Language." Language. N.p., n.d. Web. 21 May 2019.
 McCafferty, Kevin. "'[T]hunder Storms Is Verry Dangese in This Countrey They Come in Less than a Minnits Notice...' The Northern Subject Rule in Southern Irish English." The Northern Subject Rule in Southern Irish English | Kevin McCafferty. John Benjamins Publishing Company, n.d. Web. 21 May 2019.
 "Newfie English Dictionary." Largest Source of Internet Humour, Eh! N.p., n.d. Web. 21 May 2019.
 "Newfoundland." IDEA International Dialects of English Archive. N.p., n.d. Web. 21 May 2019.
 "ON THE ROAD WITH ANN – In Search of the Newfoundland Soul | Convivium." Archive.is. N.p., 19 Jan. 2013. Web. 21 May 2019.
 "Sponsored Settlement: The Colonization of Newfoundland." Sponsored Settlement: The Colonization of Newfoundland. N.p., n.d. Web. 21 May 2019.
 Statistics Canada. "Population by Selected Ethnic Origins, by Province and Territory (2006 Census)." Population by Selected Ethnic Origins, by Province and Territory (2006 Census). N.p., 28 July 2009. Web. 21 May 2019.
 "The Proper Spelling of the Newfoundland Slang "B'." GregPike.ca. N.p., 30 July 2009. Web. 21 May 2019.
 "The West Country." West Country. N.p., n.d. Web. 21 May 2019.
 "同志社大学附属 同志社国際学院 Doshisha International Academy." 同志社大学附属 同志社国際学院 Doshisha International Academy. N.p., n.d. Web. 21 May 2019.

External links 
 Dictionary of Newfoundland English, 2d ed
 CBC News report (8 November 1982) on the publication of the Dictionary
 Language: Newfoundland and Labrador Heritage
 Samples of Newfoundland Dialect(s)/Accent(s)

Languages attested from the 18th century
Canadian English
English
English language in Canada